Andrey Doroshenko (born 10 March 1977, Armavir, Krasnodar Krai) is a Russian political figure and a deputy of the 8th State Duma. From 2010 to 2012, Andrey Doroshenko was a deputy of the Armavir City Duma. From 2012 to 2021, he was a deputy of the Legislative Assembly of Krasnodar Krai of the 5th and 6th convocations. 

Since 2021, he has served as a deputy of the 8th State Duma from the Krasnodar Krai constituency.

References

1977 births
Living people
United Russia politicians
21st-century Russian politicians
Eighth convocation members of the State Duma (Russian Federation)